Sir Alfred St Valery Tebbitt (10 December 1871 – 30 March 1941) was a French-British businessman. He was managing director of Kirby, Beard & Co. and British Chamber of Commerce, Paris, and of the Hertford British Hospital, Paris.

Born in France, he was knighted in 1936, and was also a Chevalier of the Legion d'honneur (1928). He was the son of Charles Tebbitt and Emily Houston.  In 1904, he married Gladys Pendrell Smith; they had two sons and one daughter. 

He died in 1941 and is buried in the Ascension Parish Burial Ground, Cambridge.

References

1870 births
1941 deaths
British corporate directors
Officiers of the Légion d'honneur
Knights Bachelor
Place of birth missing